Parda is a surname. Notable people with the surname include:

Catarina Parda (1862–?), Brazilian slave and prostitute
Radosław Parda (born 1979), Polish politician